Agathiphaga queenslandensis is a moth of the family Agathiphagidae. It is found along the north-eastern coast of Queensland, Australia.

The wingspan is about 13 mm. Adults are night active. The forewings are unicolorous, without spots or pattern. 

In both the male and female A. queenslandensis, there are ten types of sensilla: Bohm's bristles, Chaetica I, Chaetica II, Squamiformia, Trichodea, Biforked basiconica, Short basiconica, Coeloconica I, Coeloconica II, and Coeloconic III. 

In the female A. queenslandensis they have forty-seven segments, such as the scapes and pedicel on their antenna, which measures to be 3.84 mm long. The two segments are known to be covered in scales in the front and back of their bodies.

The larvae feed on Agathis robusta. Young larvae probably bore in the cones of their host plant. Full grown larvae mine the seeds. They go into  a very long diapauze. From caterpillars found in February 1964, a number had not pupated in April 1966 and even in September 1969.

References

External links
 
Image

Agathiphagidae
Taxa named by Lionel Jack Dumbleton
Moths described in 1952
Moths of Australia